Ritter's Cove (German title Die Küstenpiloten, or "The Pilots on the Coast") is an adventure television series which aired on CBC Television from 1980 to 1981, co-produced by Canadian, West German and British companies.

Premise
Karl Ritter (Hans Caninenberg) is an aging pilot whose licence was revoked after failing to complete a medical test. He employs Kate Ashcroft (Susan Hogan) to fly his aircraft, in order to continue his transport company. Episodes highlighted the gender and generation gaps between Ritter and Ashcroft. Other primary series characters included Robert (Dale Walters) and Arnie (Craig Kelly).

Ritter's Cove was cancelled after one season. It was once considered to be a potential replacement for The Beachcombers, a CBC Television adventure series which ran from 1972 to 1990.

Scheduling
In Canada, this half-hour series was originally broadcast on CBC Fridays at 8:00 p.m. (Eastern time) from 19 September 1980 to 20 March 1981. Its only season was rebroadcast on CBC Wednesdays at 4:00 p.m. from 14 October 1981 to 31 March 1982.

References

External links
 
 

CBC Television original programming
1980 Canadian television series debuts
1981 Canadian television series endings
Aviation television series
1980s Canadian drama television series